Joseph Emmanuel Bascon, popularly known by the stage name Joem Bascon, (born August 29, 1986) is a Filipino actor. He is currently a freelance actor under Regal Entertainment and Viva Artists Agency.

Career
Bascon's first relevance in the entertainment industry came due to his supposed resemblance to established entertainers Piolo Pascual and Sam Milby. However, he has since tried to create his own image. Speaking to the Philippine Star Supreme, he says, "To be compared with Piolo and Sam is really flattering especially when I was just starting, but I want now to be known as myself, as Joem Bascon, to finally have my own identity."

Bascon is into weightlifting, boxing and kettle bell training.

Education 
He graduated from high school at Don Bosco Technical College in Mandaluyong, an exclusive school for boys. He served as a basketball varsity player then. After graduating from high school in 2003, he attended the University of Santo Tomas to study Electrical Engineering but was not able to finish it.

Filmography

Television

Film

Awards and nominations

References

External links

Joem Bascon at the Philippine Star Supreme

1986 births
Living people
ABS-CBN personalities
Filipino male television actors
Male actors from Metro Manila
Participants in Philippine reality television series
People from Manila
Star Magic
University of Santo Tomas alumni
Filipino male film actors